"Just You and I" is a song by Scottish singer-songwriter Tom Walker, originally released in an acoustic version in 2017 before achieving success when re-released in a different version in January 2019. It was included as a bonus track on various digital versions of Walker's debut album What a Time to Be Alive, and later included as the first track on the album's deluxe edition. The song reached the top three of the UK Singles Chart and the top 10 of the Irish Singles Chart in 2019.

Music video
The music video was directed by Ollie Wolf and was also released in January 2019. It features a couple who wake up handcuffed together, starring Aggy K. Adams and Kenny Fullwood.

Charts

Weekly charts

Year-end charts

Certifications

References 

2017 singles
2019 singles
2017 songs
Tom Walker (singer) songs
Song recordings produced by Mark Ralph (record producer)
Song recordings produced by Jonathan Quarmby
Songs written by Tom Walker (singer)